Cade Brem McNown (born January 12, 1977) is an American former football quarterback who played in the National Football League (NFL) for four seasons, most notably with the Chicago Bears. He played college football at UCLA, where he won the Johnny Unitas Award as a senior, and was selected by the Bears in the first round of the 1999 NFL Draft. However, his Bears tenure would only last two seasons due to injuries and inconsistent play. McNown spent his final two seasons as a backup for the Miami Dolphins and San Francisco 49ers. He was inducted to the College Football Hall of Fame in 2020.

Early years
McNown was born in Portland, Oregon. He went to high school at San Benito High School in Hollister, California, before transferring as a senior to West Linn High School in West Linn, Oregon, where he played quarterback and free safety.

He led his high school to the 1994 Oregon Class 4A semifinals, becoming wildly touted by newspapers as a college prospect. He also was active on the school track team, where he set a school pole vault record. McNown signed with UCLA after high school. His selection of UCLA was influenced by future NFL quarterback Brock Huard signing with Washington. Huard, along with McNown, were the top high school quarterback prospects in the western United States in 1994.

College career
McNown attended the University of California, Los Angeles (UCLA) and played for the Bruins from 1995 to 1998. He became the starting quarterback as a true freshman, four games into the season, ranking first among all freshmen quarterbacks in many statistics. In 1995, UCLA finished 7–5 and played in the Aloha Bowl (losing to Kansas).

McNown was less successful as a sophomore in 1996, when UCLA went 5–6 and he was ranked 9th in the Pac-10 in pass efficiency. The season ended on a high note as UCLA overcame a 17-point fourth quarter deficit to beat rival USC in overtime, 48–41.

As a junior in 1997, McNown announced the team's goal to score an average of 30 points per game. They ended up averaging 39.75 points per game. After an 0–2 start, UCLA won its remaining 10 games, including the 1998 Cotton Bowl Classic over Texas A&M, to finish Pac-10 co-champion and ranked No. 5 in the nation. McNown was named Most Outstanding Offensive Player for that year's Cotton Bowl Classic. He also was a finalist for the Davey O'Brien Award, was named an All-American by the Associated Press (third-team), The Sporting News (third-team), made the All-Pac-10 team (second-team) behind Washington State's Ryan Leaf, and finished eighth in the Heisman balloting. He led the nation in passing efficiency with a 168.6 rating. His play broke many UCLA records, most of which had been previously set by Tom Ramsey.

In his senior season in 1998, McNown led UCLA to a 10–2 record, including a Rose Bowl appearance as the sole Pac-10 champion. With McNown at the helm, the Bruins' explosive offense carried them on a school-record 20-game winning streak from the previous year, as they won their first 10 games in 1998, before losing to Miami Hurricanes in their regular season finale in a loss that broke the 20-game winning streak and knocked UCLA out of the BCS Championship Game vs. Tennessee. The disappointed Bruins then lost to Ron Dayne-led Wisconsin in the Rose Bowl, 38–31. McNown set numerous school records in passing and offense, became the Pac-10's all-time career leader in total offense, and won a collection of post-season honors, including Pac-10 co-Offensive Player of the Year, the Pop Warner Memorial Trophy for best senior player on the West Coast, consensus first-team All-American honors and the Johnny Unitas Award as the top senior quarterback in college football. McNown also finished third in balloting for the Heisman Trophy. In the 1999 Senior Bowl, McNown earned MVP honors as he threw two touchdowns in helping to lead the South team to victory.

For his career, McNown still holds many of the passing and total-offense records. McNown also holds the distinction of being the only UCLA quarterback to go 4–0 against cross-town rival USC. On October 9, 2009, McNown was inducted into the UCLA Athletics Hall of Fame. McNown was inducted into the Rose Bowl Hall of Fame on December 30, 2017. He was later inducted into the College Football Hall of Fame in 2020.

Statistics

Professional career

Following the scouting combine, some scouts questioned the strength of his throwing arm. McNown, along with Akili Smith, Daunte Culpepper, and Donovan McNabb, appeared on the cover of ESPN The Magazine in the issue highlighting the draft. He was selected by the Chicago Bears with the twelfth overall pick in the first round of the 1999 NFL Draft, following a draft pick trade with the Washington Redskins. He was the highest-drafted Bears quarterback since Jim McMahon.

In the months preceding draft day, the Bears had declared that Erik Kramer would be the starting quarterback, but waived him prior to signing McNown, who they named as the upcoming season's starter. He was a contract holdout most of training camp, eventually agreeing to a $22 million contract. Head coach Dick Jauron announced that Shane Matthews would be the starter, but that McNown would play at least one series every game to gain experience.

McNown started his first game for the Bears on October 10 following a hamstring injury to Matthews the previous week. During the game on December 26, following a poor performance against the Rams, McNown chose to sit out the second half of the game. He was replaced as starter by Jim Miller, and was again named the starter following Miller's suspension. On December 19 against Detroit on Dec 19, he set franchise rookie records with 27 completions, 301 yards and 4 touchdowns; he also holds the rookie record for pass attempts, with 42 in the season finale loss to Tampa Bay. 

He was named the Bears' 2000 starter over Matthews (Miller was injured during the pre-season), but his performance grew noticeably worse through the season; the Bears under McNown fell to 1–6, leading the home crowd to regularly chant for Miller's return. He suffered a shoulder injury during the seventh game of the season (against Philadelphia), was briefly replaced by Miller, who also suffered an injury and was replaced by Matthews. McNown started (and lost) one more game that season, against San Francisco. Although he was benched for the final game of the season at the Detroit Lions, he came in after Matthews was injured again and helped lead the Bears to an upset win that eliminated the Lions from what appeared to be a sure playoff berth.

McNown was traded during the 2001 preseason to the Miami Dolphins, along with a seventh-round pick, for a sixth-round pick, and a conditional 2003 seventh-round pick. In Chicago, he had fallen down the depth chart, below Miller and Matthews, competing against Danny Wuerffel for the third-string position. He was named the third-string quarterback for the Dolphins, and saw no action during the season.

The Dolphins traded McNown to the San Francisco 49ers for a conditional seventh-round draft pick during the 2002 offseason. By then, Terry Donahue, former head coach at UCLA, was the general manager. Interest was briefly raised in McNown, as the 49ers were searching for a quarterback for the West Coast offense. Although he was initially competing against Tim Rattay, Giovanni Carmazzi and Brandon Doman for the backup spot behind starter Jeff Garcia, McNown reinjured his shoulder during the preseason. When it was revealed he required season-ending surgery, he was placed on injured reserve. McNown was released by the 49ers during the 2003 offseason. His rights were shortly thereafter acquired by the Calgary Stampeders, although he was never signed.

NFL career statistics

Personal life
McNown was charged in September 1999 with the illegal possession of a disabled parking pass while playing football at UCLA in 1996, to which he pleaded no contest. Other players charged included Skip Hicks, Larry Atkins, Marques Anderson, and Brendon Ayanbadejo.

In 2000, it was reported that McNown had been dating 1999 Playboy Playmate of the Year Heather Kozar, and future (2001) Playmate of the Year Brande Roderick.

McNown is married to Christina, daughter of actor and dancer John Brascia and actress and model Sondra Scott. As of June 2016, he and Christina have four children.

McNown later worked for UBS in the private wealth group before joining JPMorgan Chase Private Bank. In 2013, McNown joined capital management firm Lourd Murray as a vice president. In 2016, McNown joined Kayne Anderson as a senior managing director.  In June 2022, McNown joined The Carlyle Group as a Managing Director and Client Relationship Manager.

On October 22, 2021, Tunnel 8 at the Rose Bowl was named in Cade McNown's honor.

See also
 List of NCAA Division I FBS quarterbacks with at least 10,000 career passing yards
 List of NCAA major college football yearly passing leaders

Footnotes

External links
San Francisco 49ers profile (archived from 2002)
UCLA profile (archived from 1999)

1977 births
Living people
All-American college football players
American football quarterbacks
College Football Hall of Fame inductees
Chicago Bears players
People from West Linn, Oregon
Players of American football from California
Players of American football from Portland, Oregon
UCLA Bruins football players
People from Hollister, California